Juan Arbelaez (born October 31, 1990) is a retired Colombian footballer.

Career

High school
He was varsity since his freshman year at West Hall High School. In 2009, he was captain and lead his team into state finals which they lost 3-0.

College
Arbelaez played for Georgia Perimeter College before transferring to Virginia Commonwealth University his junior year. While playing at GPC he registered eight goals and eleven assists in his first season. In his first season with the Rams, Arbelaez 17 appearances, all as substitutes. He scored one goal, and had one assist during the 2011 season. In 2012, Arbelaez became a regular starter for the Rams, who had a breakthrough season, starting 20 of 21 matches with VCU. That season, the Rams reached the 2012 Atlantic 10 Men's Soccer Tournament final, and played in the 2012 NCAA Division I Men's Soccer Championship.

Professional
Arbelaez was selected by the Montreal Impact of Major League Soccer in the third round of the 2013 MLS Supplemental Draft.  However, he did not sign with the Impact, and subsequently signed with the Richmond Kickers of USL Pro.

Arbelaez made his debut with Richmond on April 20, 2013, in a 4–1 victory.

References

External links
 VCU Rams bio

1990 births
Living people
People from Pereira, Colombia
People from Hall County, Georgia
Sportspeople from the Atlanta metropolitan area
Soccer players from Georgia (U.S. state)
Association football midfielders
Colombian footballers
VCU Rams men's soccer players
CF Montréal draft picks
Richmond Kickers players
USL Championship players
Colombian expatriate footballers
Colombian expatriate sportspeople in the United States
Expatriate soccer players in the United States